The Organisation de la microfrancophonie (OMF; ; shortened to Microfrancophonie) is an intermicronational organisation that aims to promote French-speaking (Francophone) micronations in communities in France and increase intermicronational cooperation. Founded in 2015 and based on the Organisation internationale de la Francophonie, Microfrancophonie accepts micronations as member states, and has hosted three intermicronational summits between these members. , Microfrancophonie had 21 member states.

Summits 
The first summit was held in Aigues-Mortes, Occitania between 23–24 September 2016, hosted by the Principality of Aigues-Mortes. According to organiser and self-proclaimed head of state of the Principality Jean-Pierre Pichon (dubbing himself Prince Jean-Pierre IV): "The role of this first summit of micronations is to introduce the public to this fundamental movement intended to engage citizens in social, environmental and cultural actions." The second summit took place in Vincennes, Paris on 21 July 2018, and was hosted by the Empire of Angyalistan. It had fifteen attendees. A coinciding exhibition for the summit at a local museum hosted micronational passports, currencies, newspapers and other local productions. The third summit took place in Blaye in Nouvelle-Aquitaine between 27–28 August 2022. It was organised by the Principality of Hélianthis, and had fifteen attendees representing seven member states of Microfrancophonie.

Members
Organisation de la microfrancophonie has the following members:

See also 
MicroCon—biannual micronational convention

Footnotes

References

External links 

2015 establishments in France
Organizations established in 2015
International cultural organizations
International organizations based in France
Micronational culture